Kermit Murdock (20 March 1908 – 11 February 1981) was an American film, television and radio actor known for his avuncular and professorial character portrayals.

His more prominent character roles in major motion pictures included Dean Pollard in Splendor in the Grass (1961), Henderson, the banker in In the Heat of The Night (1967), and Dr. Robertson in The Andromeda Strain (1970).

He is also remembered for his voice acting in many episodes of the 1950s science fiction radio series X Minus One. He was in The Mysterious Traveler episode "Survival of the Fittest" with Everett Sloane, and was featured in an episode of the series Adventure Ahead.

He appeared in character roles in television programs of the 1960s and 1970s including episodes of The Mary Tyler Moore Show,  Kung Fu, The Mod Squad, and The Defenders. He portrayed a prosecutor of witches in the penultimate Star Trek episode, "All Our Yesterdays" (1969).

Filmography

 1976 "Rich Man, Poor Man".  The Minister

References

External links
 

1908 births
1981 deaths
20th-century American male actors
American male television actors
American male voice actors
American radio personalities
Male actors from Pittsburgh